Marlbrook is a village in Worcestershire, England.

It is located 3 miles north east of Bromsgrove, between Upper Catshill from which it is separated by the A38 road, and Lickey Hills.

History

Herbert Austin, founder of the Austin motor company, lived in Marlbrook at Grange Park, on what is now Lord Austin Drive.

Villages in Worcestershire